Jon Philip Theodore (born December 30, 1973) is an American drummer. He is best known as a former member of the Mars Volta and as the current drummer for Queens of the Stone Age. After contributing to Bright Eyes' 2020 album, Down in the Weeds, Where the World Once Was, Theodore joined the band in 2022 as their touring drummer.

Known for his explosive, multi-textural playing style, Theodore was a member of both Golden and Royal Trux before joining The Mars Volta in 2001. Theodore remained within the band for five years, recording the band's first three studio albums, De-Loused in the Comatorium (2003), Frances the Mute (2005) and Amputechture (2006), before departing at the request of guitarist and bandleader Omar Rodríguez-López.

Theodore subsequently formed a collaboration with Rage Against the Machine vocalist Zack de la Rocha, entitled One Day as a Lion, and performed on Incubus frontman Brandon Boyd's solo album, The Wild Trapeze (2010). In 2012, Theodore replaced his Mars Volta successor Thomas Pridgen in the supergroup Giraffe Tongue Orchestra, though by 2015 the lineup had reverted to Pridgen on drums.

In 2013, Theodore joined Queens of the Stone Age, replacing Joey Castillo, who left the band citing burnout from constant touring. Although Dave Grohl recorded the drums on Queens of the Stone Age's sixth studio album ...Like Clockwork (2013), Theodore accompanied them on the subsequent tour and has since become a full-time member.

Biography 

Theodore first started playing drums at the age of 15. He was soon involved with his high school concert band at Gilman School in Baltimore, Maryland, and took lessons on a full kit shortly after. It was at this point that he studied percussion and learned how to map arrangements; dedicated practice had already become a habit. He also listened to a great variety of music, growing to love the likes of Billy Cobham, Elvin Jones and John Bonham. He studied at the Oberlin Conservatory of Music in Ohio.

Around the end of his time in high school, he joined the band Golden and recorded and toured with them for ten years. He also played with Royal Trux for a year and a half. It was during this time that he met Cedric Bixler Zavala and Omar Rodríguez-López, who were performing their first gig with their experimental dub band De Facto in El Paso, TX. They became friends and the former At the Drive-In duo would later invite Theodore to join their Latin-tinged prog-rock band, The Mars Volta. Theodore was The Mars Volta's drummer from 2001 to 2006. On July 30, 2006, it was announced that Jon Theodore would be permanently replaced. He was quoted in Modern Drummer: "It was long overdue and unquestionably the best thing for everyone involved. We had a great run of things, made some decent records, blew it up for a minute, and had some really great times. But the life ran out of it. I'm currently working on some pretty sweet tunes for a new project. The details will follow once it takes shape." In 2012, Mars Volta bassist Juan Alderete stated, "I love Jon, and I do keep in touch with him. Jon was unhappy and when someone is unhappy, someone has to pull the trigger; and its Omar's band so he did just that. [...] They had to let him go because he wasn't into it as much as they wanted him to be."

Theodore has also completed a collaboration with Zack de la Rocha of Rage Against the Machine entitled One Day as a Lion. Their first EP was released on July 22, 2008 In January 2012, he joined Giraffe Tongue Orchestra, replacing fellow former Mars Volta drummer Thomas Pridgen. He recently played as Dam Funk's touring drummer during his Fall 2012 US Tour.

A press release from the band Queens of the Stone Age revealed that Theodore would contribute drums on their upcoming album ...Like Clockwork. He played on the title track on the album, which was the first Queens album to reach number one on the Billboard 200. It also reached number two on the UK Albums Chart and was nominated for three Grammy Awards, including Best Rock Album. Following the release of the album in 2013, he became the permanent drummer of Queens of the Stone Age.

In 2018, Theodore performed drums on certain sections of the score for the video game Red Dead Redemption 2. His Queens of the Stone Age bandmates Josh Homme and Michael Shuman also are featured on the score.

Influences 
Theodore draws inspiration from many different forms of music but those most prevalent in his playing are jazz, fusion, and rock. He has also touched upon another factor which adds to his individual style – "Then there's a whole bunch of stuff from Haiti because my dad's Haitian. My favorite Haitian drummer is this guy called Azor (drummer) ... ...The Haitian music that moves me has the drumming from the voodoo rituals. It moves me because the patterns are connected to different spirits; it's a spiritual thing that is interconnected with dancing, sacrifice and devotion. It's fully passionate. There is nothing contrived about it."

In interviews he regularly cites Billy Cobham of The Mahavishnu Orchestra as his main drumming influence: "My all-time favorite drummer is Billy Cobham. I love the way he plays... ...[his] playing is so natural, powerful and dynamic at the same time. I pattern a lot of stuff after him.". He has also been heavily inspired by John Bonham of Led Zeppelin: "He had one of the best feels in the history of rock... ...because [of him] I try and play with as much bombast as I possibly can."

Theodore has also mentioned the following drummers and musicians as influences: Elvin Jones, Neil Peart, Keith Moon, Phil Rudd, Tony Williams, Sebastian Thomson, Tim Soete, Herbie Hancock, Doug Scharin, Joseph "Zigaboo" Modeliste, Mitchell Feldstein, Damon Che, Dale Crover, John McEntire, Ryan Rapsys and Brann Dailor.

Equipment 
Drums: 
Queens of the Stone Age

DW Jazz Series in White Glass

14x10 or 13x9 tom
16x16 floor tom
18x16 floor tom
26x14 or 24x14 bass drum with rail and cymbal mount
14x5.5 DW Aluminum snare

Ludwig Vistalite in red

6.5×14 Supraphonic snare
9×13 tom
14×16 floor tom
16×18 floor tom
16×22 bass drum

The Mars Volta, One Day as a Lion, etc.

Ludwig Stainless Steel Kit
14x10 tom
16x16 floor tom
18x16 floor tom
24x14 bass drum

Jon has stated in interviews that he is still hoping to find a 26x14 stainless steel kick but also enjoys the punchier sound of his current bass.

Prior to the Stainless Steel kit he used:

Fibes Crystalite Acrylic Kit
14x10 tom
16x16 floor tom
18x16 floor tom
26x14 kick

Added to the kits were a DW Rail Mount and kick spurs.

He used a Ludwig LM402T chrome over aluminium snare drum with aftermarket die cast hoops.

Theodore has also used various "jellybean" kits made with toms, snares, and bass drums made from Ludwig, Yamaha, Slingerland, Gretsch, and Sonor, among others.

Cymbals: 
Of recent times Jon has an endorsement contract with Zildjian cymbals. Like most artists his setup varies somewhat over time.

13" combo hats (e.g. K top over A New Beat bottom or A Quick Beat top over A New Beat top)

2x 19" medium thin crashes from any of the A Custom, Avedis or K lines:
For example, he has on occasion used two 19" A Custom Projections, on others a 19" K Med Thin Dark and a 19" Avedis Med Thin and on still others a 19" A Custom Projection and a 19" Avedis Med Thin. His Zildjian profile states he uses 2x 19" Avedis med Thin crashes.

21" Avedis Sweet Ride, sometimes with four sizzlers, 22" K Ride, 22" Avedis Medium Ride, or 23" Sweet Ride.

A "stack of totally busted stuff on a cymbal stand" was used in The Mars Volta. On the stand were two hi-hats cymbals with holes drilled through them, a splash cymbal with a cracked bell, a Zildjian ZXT Trashformer and various, smaller shredded cymbals with metal washers. Theodore switched to a 17" K China with QOTSA.

Hardware:
Prior to his endorsement with DW, Jon used Pearl Eliminator single kick pedal and applied surf wax for playing barefoot, along with various straight cymbal stands. Now Theodore uses DW 7000 series Hi-hat and straight cymbal stands with a 5000 pedal.

Heads:
Remo coated Ambassador on snare batter, CS dots on tom and bass drum batters, clear Ambassadors on bottoms of toms and on front of bass drum.

He has also used Powerstroke 3 bass batters (and, on occasion, as resonant heads, too) with a falam pad and coated Ambassadors.

Sticks: Jon is a Vic Firth endorser. He uses their American Classic Extreme 5B wood tip model.

Discography 
With Golden
Golden
Super Golden Original Movement
Golden Summer
Apollo Stars
Rhythm & Beat Jazz 12"

With HiM
New Features (2001)
Five & Six In Dub (2000)
Our Point Of Departure (2000)

With Hikaru Utada
"Kremlin Dusk" (2004)

With Royal Trux
3-Song EP (1998)
Veterans of Disorder (1999)

With Will Oldham
Ease Down the Road

With Trans Am
Illegal Ass EP
[[Red Line (album)|The Red Line LP (2000)]]

With The Fucking Am
Gold (2004)

With The Mars Volta
Tremulant (2002)
De-Loused in the Comatorium (2003)
Live (2003)
Frances the Mute (2005)
Scabdates (2005)
Amputechture (2006)

With SaberTooth Tiger
Death Valley b/w Love Money (GSL 12th Anniversary Single)
Extinction Is Inevitable LP (2006)

With Omar Rodríguez-López
Se Dice Bisonte, No Búfalo (2007) – "La Tiranía de la Tradición"
Old Money (2008) – "Population Council's Wet Dream" & "Family War Funding (Love Those Rothschilds)"
Arañas en La Sombra (2016)
Some Need It Lonely (2016) – "Bitter Sunsets" & "Zophiel"
Gorilla Preacher Cartel (2017) – "Buying Friendships"

With One Day as a Lion
One Day as a Lion (EP, 2008)

With Holloys
Art Wars (2009)
Make It Happen (2009)

With Brandon Boyd
The Wild Trapeze (2010)

With Puscifer
Conditions of My Parole (2011)
Money Shot (2015)

With Queens of the Stone Age
...Like Clockwork (2013) – "...Like Clockwork"
iTunes Festival: London 2013 – EP (2013)
...Like Cologne – EP (2013)
Villains (2017)

With Life Coach
Alphawaves (2013)

With Mini Mansions
Leeds Festival (2019)

With Bright Eyes
 Down in the Weeds, Where the World Once Was  (2020)

With Kirk Hammett
 Portals (2022)

References

External links 
 Golden's Page on Epitonic
 The Holloys
 The Mars Volta
 [ Him in Allmusic]
 Jon Theodore In Taringa
 Zildjian Artist Biography

1973 births
Living people
Oberlin College alumni
Gilman School alumni
American musicians of Haitian descent
Place of birth missing (living people)
The Mars Volta members
20th-century American drummers
American male drummers
21st-century American drummers
20th-century American male musicians
21st-century American male musicians
Musicians from Baltimore
Queens of the Stone Age members
One Day as a Lion members